Culkin is an Irish surname. Notable people with the surname include:

Courtney Rachel Culkin, American model
Francis D. Culkin (1874–1943), Republican member of the United States House of Representatives from New York
John M. Culkin, SJ, PhD (1928–1993), media scholar and critic, educator, writer and consultant
Kieran Culkin (born 1982), American Golden Globe-nominated actor
Kit Culkin (born 1944), American broadway actor and father of Macaulay, Kieran and Rory
Macaulay Culkin (born 1980), American actor
Margaret Culkin Banning (1891–1982), author of thirty-six novels and early advocate of women's rights
Michael Culkin, British actor
Nick Culkin (born 1978), former English football goalkeeper
Rory Culkin (born 1989), American actor
Sean Culkin (born 1993), American football player

Surnames of Irish origin